was a Japanese breaststroke swimmer. He represented his native country in three consecutive Summer Olympics, starting in 1984. His best Olympic result was the 7th place (2:14.70) in the Men's 200m Breaststroke event at the 1992 Summer Olympics in Barcelona, Spain. He was the grandson of Hisakichi Toyoda, who won a gold medal in the 4 × 200 m freestyle in the 1932 Summer Olympics.

At the 1986 Asian Games in Seoul, Watanabe won the gold medal in the 200m breaststroke and the bronze medal in the 100m breaststroke.

Watanabe again won gold in the 200m breaststroke at the 1990 Asian Games in Beijing.  He also won silver medals in the 100m breaststroke and the 4 × 100 m medley relay.

Watanabe died at his home on September 18, 2017. He was 48 years old.

References

External links
 
 

1969 births
2017 deaths
Olympic swimmers of Japan
Swimmers at the 1984 Summer Olympics
Swimmers at the 1988 Summer Olympics
Swimmers at the 1992 Summer Olympics
Asian Games medalists in swimming
Swimmers at the 1986 Asian Games
Swimmers at the 1990 Asian Games
Japanese male breaststroke swimmers
Asian Games gold medalists for Japan
Asian Games silver medalists for Japan
Asian Games bronze medalists for Japan
Medalists at the 1986 Asian Games
Medalists at the 1990 Asian Games
20th-century Japanese people